This is the list of companies that manufacture cement in Uganda.

 Tororo Cement Limited
 Hima Cement Limited
 Kampala Cement Company Limited
 Simba Cement Uganda Limited
 Sinoma Cement Factory Uganda Limited (Under development)

Production
, Uganda cement manufacturers had installed capacity of 6,800,000 tonnes of cement annually, with Tororo Cement Limited being responsible for 3.0 million tonnes (44 percent) and Hima Cement Limited producing  1.9 million tonnes (28 percent). Simba Cement Uganda Limited* produces 1 million tonnes annually (15 percent). The remaining companies are responsible for the remaining 900,000 tonnes (13 percent).

In January 2018, Uganda's consumption was estimated at 2.4 million tonnes annually; 35.3 percent of total annual production, although that percentage is on the rise, given the multitude of major, ongoing infrastructure projects in the county. The remaining output that is not consumed locally is marketed to regional neighboring countries, including Rwanda, Kenya, South Sudan and eastern Democratic Republic of the Congo.
Note: Simba Cement Uganda Limited, is a wholly owned subsidiary of National Cement Company Limited of Kenya.

Marketsharing

The table below illustrates the rankings of Uganda's cement manufacturers, based on annual production figures, for the calendar year 2018.

See also
List of cement manufacturers in Kenya
List of cement manufacturers in Rwanda
List of cement manufacturers in Tanzania
List of companies and cities in Africa that manufacture cement

References

External links
 Uganda: Cement industry news from Global Cement 
Uganda: Two New Cement Plants In Tororo By 2018

Cement companies of Uganda
Cement manufacturers

Manufacturing in Uganda
Uganda